Pietro Carlo Borboni (Lugano 1720-Cesena 1773) was a Swiss architect, active in a late Baroque style, known for his works in Cesena, region of Emilia-Romagna, Italy.

He was born in Lugano in the Ticino, and the details of his early life and training are unknown. He is listed as architetto municipale (municipal architect) in documents of Cesena, where he lived from 1743 to his death. Among the many works he completed locally were:
Reconstruction (1764) of the new church of San Zenone, Cesena
Ponte San Clemente over the River Savio
Pescheria of Cesena 
Chapel of the Madonna del Popolo (1679) for the Cesena Cathedral
Dome of Sanctuary of Maria del Monte, Cesena
Church of the Servi, Cesena

He also worked in Savignano sul Rubicone.

References

1720 births
1773 deaths
People from Lugano
18th-century Italian architects